Roots reggae is a subgenre of reggae that deals with the everyday lives and aspirations of Africans and those in the African Diaspora, including the spiritual side of Rastafari, black liberation,  revolution and the honoring of God, called Jah by Rastafarians. It is identified with the life of the ghetto sufferer, and the rural poor. Lyrical themes include spirituality and religion, struggles by artists, poverty, black pride, social issues, resistance to fascism, capitalism, corrupt government and racial oppression. A spiritual repatriation to Africa is a common theme in roots reggae.

History
The increasing influence of the Rastafari movement after the visit of Haile Selassie to Jamaica in 1966 played a major part in the development of roots reggae, with spiritual themes becoming more common in reggae lyrics in the late 1960s. Important early roots reggae releases included Winston Holness's "Blood & Fire" (1970) and Yabby You's "Conquering Lion" (1972). Political unrest also played its part, with the 1972 election campaign of Michael Manley targeting the support of Jamaica's ghetto communities. Increasing violence associated with the opposing political parties was also a common lyrical theme, with tracks such as Junior Murvin's "Police & Thieves" and Culture's "Two Sevens Clash".

The heyday of roots reggae is usually considered the latter half of the 1970s – with artists such as The Abyssinians, Johnny Clarke, Cornell Campbell, Bob Marley, Peter Tosh, Burning Spear, Dennis Brown, Max Romeo, Horace Andy, Hugh Mundell, and Lincoln Thompson, and groups like Black Uhuru, Steel Pulse, Israel Vibration, The Gladiators and Culture – teaming up with producers such as Lee 'Scratch' Perry, Bunny Lee, Joseph Hoo Kim and Coxsone Dodd. The Sound system (Jamaican) was of unequalled importance in spreading reggae and dub, with the diaspora represented by leading sound system operators such as Jah Shaka, who, in turn, went on to profoundly influence many in Britain and the world, influencing early punk rock musicians in London, as well as definitively shaping later bass  dominated genres such as Jungle music and Drum and bass. The experimental pioneering of such producers within often-restricted technological parameters gave birth to dub, and is seen by some music historians as one of the earliest (albeit analogue) contributions to modern dance music production techniques.

Roots reggae became popular in Europe in the 1970s, especially among left-wing white youths in Western Europe. The Wailers' popularity in Europe opened the door for other artists, and roots reggae artists became popular with punk rock fans. When Jamaicans turned to dancehall, a lot of black, white and mixed roots reggae bands were formed in Europe. Later on roots reggae made its way into the United States with the migration of Jamaicans to New York. This took place with the reforms made to American immigration laws in the early 1960s. Along with localized traditions and food, reggae music was inevitably brought as well, contributing to the New York City soundscape, such as the development of hip hop.

While roots reggae was largely overtaken in popularity in Jamaica by dancehall, several artists from the original era, such as Culture, Burning Spear, and Israel Vibration continued to produce roots reggae, and artists like Beres Hammond and Freddie McGregor continued the use of roots reggae, as a musical style and thematically, through the 1980s. In the 1990s younger Jamaican artists became interested in the Rastafari movement and began incorporating roots themes into their music. Most notable among the new generation of "conscious" artists was Garnett Silk, whose positive spiritual message and consistent use of roots and rocksteady riddims gave him cross generational appeal with Caribbean audiences. While other notable dancehall stars like Capleton and Buju Banton became devout Rastas and changed their musical direction as a result. Other modern roots artists and bands also emerged at this time, including Luciano, Junior Kelly, Morgan Heritage, Anthony B,  and Sizzla.

Roots Reggae and Africa
Similar to the oversimplification and limitations of the terminology middle passage, the roots reggae displays Africa as a mythical paradise that functions primarily as a motivating symbol, imagined origin, and semantic center. "More so even than earlier sounds, roots reggae always seemed to invite itself directly to Africa, brazenly insisting upon itself as the continent's primary echo, if not recursive mirror". The mythical Africas articulated and reinforced through roots reggae were shaped by desire, nostalgia, and trauma, and produced "by the local politics of American and the Caribbean". While Africa is used literally and metaphorically for resistance and as an inspiration for revolution against Babylon, Africa risks made as a source of information for an authentic black identity and an authentic black culture, one that requires Africa's rigidity and the "authority of the most potent, dangerous, and unstable metaphor known to humanity: the metaphor of roots" (79).

This metaphor of roots is dangerous mainly because its instability or fluidity has been dismissed, which in turn marginalizes modern and contemporary Africa as it is forced into subordination by an increasingly diasporic framework. The consequential use of Africa is visible when it is "relentlessly celebrated for its anteriority yet surpassed by the echoes of its cultural influence" (80). The truth is, the reality and imagination of Africa clash when a critical analytic lens is used to view the appropriation and indigenization of imported black diasporic music, such as roots reggae through networks of consumption and production, that beg to differ from the notion of a dormant, static Africa.

The legacies of roots reggae, along with transnational racial solidarity, become "pastiche...evoked as performances for black tourists seeking 'home' or used by authoritarian 'revolutionary leaders' to maintain power in the name of anti-colonial racial solidarity".

See also
List of roots reggae artists

References

External links
 Roots-Archives – Searchable database of Jamaican Roots Reggae albums from 1970 to 1985
 Strictly Vibes : Roots Vinyl Database

Reggae genres